During the 1989–90 season Sunderland competed in the Football League Second Division. They finished sixth in the league and were promoted via the play-offs.

Squad

Results
Sunderland's score comes first.

Second Division

Play-offs

League table

League Cup

FA Cup

Full Members Cup

Statistics

Goal scorers

References

Sunderland A.F.C. seasons
Sun